The Long Man of Wilmington or Wilmington Giant is a hill figure on the steep slopes of Windover Hill near Wilmington, East Sussex, England. Locally, the figure was once often called the "Green Man".

Formerly thought to originate in the Iron Age or even the neolithic period, a 2003 archaeological investigation showed that the figure may have been cut in the Early Modern era – the 16th or 17th century AD. From afar the figure appears to have been carved from the underlying chalk; but the modern figure is formed from white-painted breeze blocks and lime mortar.

The Long Man is one of two major extant human hill figures in England; the other is the Cerne Abbas Giant, north of Dorchester. Both are Scheduled Monuments. Two other hill figures that include humans are the Osmington White Horse and the Fovant regimental badges. 

The Long Man is also one of two hill figures in East Sussex; the other is the Litlington White Horse, 3 miles south-west of the Long Man.

Origins

The origin of the Long Man remains unclear. For many years the earliest known record was a drawing made by William Burrell when he visited Wilmington Priory, near Windover (or Wind-door) Hill, in 1766. Burrell's drawing shows a figure holding a rake and a scythe, both shorter than the present staves. In 1993, another drawing was discovered in the Devonshire Collections at Chatsworth House which had been made by the surveyor John Rowley in 1710, now the first definite date on which the figure is known to have existed.

An early suggestion, sometimes stated to be a local tradition, was that the Long Man had been cut by monks from nearby Wilmington Priory, and represented a pilgrim, but this was not widely believed by antiquarians, who felt that monks were unlikely to have created an unclothed figure. Until fairly recently the Long Man was most commonly asserted to have been cut in the neolithic period, primarily due to the presence of a long barrow nearby, or given an Iron Age attribution based on a perceived similarity to other hill figures.

John North wrote that during the centuries around 3480 BC the figure would have been positioned to mark the constellation Orion's movement across the ridge above it. The figure, according to this interpretation, may have been a manifestation of a Neolithic astral religion. Another suggestion was that the figure had a Romano-British provenance, while an origin in the time of Anglo-Saxon England gained credence after the 1964 discovery at Finglesham in Kent of an Anglo-Saxon buckle depicting a figure, (possibly Odin), holding two spears in a similar fashion to the Long Man.

Archaeological work performed in 2003 by Martin Bell of the University of Reading, in association with Aubrey Manning's Open University programme Landscape Mysteries, strongly suggested that the figure dates from the Early Modern period – the 16th or 17th century AD. Bell found that the slope on which the Long Man was cut had gone through a period of instability in this time, after a very long prior period of stability, suggesting that the figure was first cut then. This has opened up the possibility that the Long Man could be a Tudor or Stuart-era political satire in the manner recently posited for the Cerne Abbas giant, or possibly a religious image associated with the Reformation: Ronald Hutton noted that "we can at least celebrate the fact that we have our first, apparently unequivocally, Early Modern hill figure, and historians now have to reckon with it."

Pre-20th century history

Whatever the figure's origin, for much of its history it seems to have existed only as a shadow or indentation in the grass, visible after a light fall of snow or as a different shade of green in summer: it is described or illustrated as such in 1710, 1781, 1800, 1835 and 1851. Indeed, the figure was once known locally as the "Green Man". Earlier depictions, such as those of Rowley and Burrell, show other details such as a possible scythe blade on the right-hand staff and the suggestion of a helmet or hat on the figure's head: they also indicate a different, albeit indistinct, position for the feet. The current outline of the Long Man is largely the result of a 'restoration' of 1873–74, when a group led by the vicar of Glynde, Reverend William de St Croix, marked out the outline with yellow bricks whitewashed and cemented together, though it has been claimed that the restoration process distorted the position of the feet.

The archaeologist John S. Phené, who was co-opted into the project and whose 1873 talk to the Royal Institute of British Architects had originally inspired it, initially expressed his reservations with both the bricking and the design used. The original intention of the 'restoration' had been to cut the figure down to the chalk bedrock, but had been abandoned after trials showed that the soil depth made this too difficult.

In the years after the 'restoration' several people familiar with the figure commented that the feet were altered, having originally both pointed outwards and downwards so that "the Giant appeared to be coming down the hill", in the words of Ann Downs, who had grown up at Wilmington Priory in the 1840s. Resistivity surveys conducted in the 1990s by R. Castleden, combined with examination of apparent shadow marks shown in early photographs, have provided strong evidence that the feet had in fact pointed outwards as described by 19th century observers and had been slightly lower than in the current outline. The surveys showed that the figure had likely been originally cut by trenching, in the same manner as other chalk hill figures, but had been abandoned after only a few scourings.

There was also some evidence to suggest that the feature on one staff similar to a scythe blade, flail or shepherd's crook was genuine, along with a suggestion of a "helmet" or hat.

20th and 21st centuries

In 1925, the site of the Long Man was given to the Sussex Archaeological Trust (now the Sussex Archaeological Society) by the Duke of Devonshire. During the Second World War it was painted green to avoid it being used as a landmark by German aircraft.

The 1993 book, The Druid Way by Sussex author Philip Carr-Gomm, drew attention to the supposed significance of the Long Man as a sacred site for the modern world.

At dawn on May Day, the Long Man Morris Men dance at the foot of the Long Man. The Long Man plays host to neo-pagan rituals on Sundays closest to the eight Pagan Festivals through the year.

In 2007, the site was used in television fashion show Trinny & Susannah Undress the Nation. Trinny Woodall, Susannah Constantine and 100 women gave the Long Man a temporary female form by using their bodies to add pigtails, breasts and hips. The women created the effect by lying down in white boiler suits to make shapes. ITV were given permission for the event by Sussex Archaeological Society and that they took "the utmost care ... to protect this historical site". The hillside chalk carving was not permanently changed or affected. However the scene prompted twenty-two Neo-Pagans to protest at the site during filming. The Long Man is claimed as 'sacred' by the Council of British Druid Orders, who said the 'stunt' would "dishonour an ancient Pagan site of worship".  The owners, Sussex Archaeological Society, later apologised for any offence caused to any "individuals or groups" by the filming. 

Overnight, on 17/18 June 2010 a giant phallus was painted on the Long Man rivalling that of the Cerne Abbas Giant. Observed by locals it appeared that a football pitch marker or similar object was used to paint the phallus.

On 16 October 2015, anti-fracking protesters added the words "FRACK OFF!" above the Long Man, in protest against fracking being approved in the area. The words were removed quickly and were believed to have been made out of tarpaulin.

On 27 January 2021, during the COVID-19 pandemic, a face mask was painted on to the Long Man.

Literary inclusions

In Arthur Beckett's 1909 Spirit of the Downs, a chapter is dedicated to the Long Man of Wilmington, in "The Hero on the Hill", and gives a fictional account of the invading Saxon's victory over the Britons, who celebrate by drawing an enormous figure on the Downs.

Eleanor Farjeon, in her book Martin Pippin in the Daisy Field (1937), gives a fancy origin of the giant in a form of a folktale told by Martin Pippin the bard to six young girls in the daisy field.

In his comic The Sandman #19 (1990), Neil Gaiman interprets the figure as the guardian of a gateway into Faerie.

The Long Man plays a prominent role in the Spike and Suzy comic book The Circle of Power (1998).

The giant is omnipresent in the post-apocalyptic future of the science-fiction book by Lord Dunsany The Pleasures of a Futuroscope written in 1955.

The figure also features in The Old Weird Albion by Justin Hopper and The Light Keeper by Cole Moreton.

The Long Man is frequently referenced in the works of English SF/Fantasy author John Whitbourn.

Musical interpretations 
The Long Man has long been an influence on artists, musicians, and authors. The composers Benjamin Britten and Frank Bridge would often picnic at the foot of the figure. It has inspired The Long Man's Legs (SAB Choir, soprano soloist and narrater) by Tony Biggin and On Windover Hill by Nathan James, which was premiered at Boxgrove Priory, near Chichester, by the Royal Philharmonic Concert Orchestra and Harlequin Chamber Choir on 7 March 2020. The figure was also an influence on Avril Coleridge-Taylor's work for chorus and orchestra, Wyndore, which was written in Alfriston in 1936. The folk-singer, Maria Cunningham, wrote a folk song about the Long Man in 1996.

Electronic pop group Kissing the Pink shot the promotional video for their 1982 single "Mr Blunt" at the Long Man.

In fiction
In the children's television programme Thomas & Friends twelfth-series episode The Man in The Hills, The Man in The Hills is based on The Long Man of Wilmington.

In the ninth episode of the Japanese TV series Cowboy Bebop, "Jamming with Edward", an image of the Long Man is seen briefly alongside other landscape carvings, although now it is located in South America.

See also
 Firle Corn
 Cerne Abbas Giant
 Hill figure
 Litlington White Horse
 Uffington White Horse
 Marree Man

References

Bibliography
The Wilmington Giant: The Quest for a Lost Myth, Rodney Castleden, Turnstone Press (1983).

External links

 Long Man of Wilmington at the Sussex Archaeological Society

Archaeological sites in East Sussex
Hill figures in England
Scheduled monuments in East Sussex
East Sussex folklore